American Ninja 2: The Confrontation is a 1987 American martial arts action film directed by Sam Firstenberg. A sequel to American Ninja (1985), it is the second installment in the American Ninja franchise, followed by American Ninja 3: Blood Hunt (1989). It stars Michael Dudikoff, Steve James, Jeff Weston, Gary Conway, Michelle Botes and Larry Poindexter. The film is about two U.S. Army Rangers (Dudikoff and James) who are ordered to discover why Marines have been going missing from their posts at the US Embassy. The two discover The Lion (Conway) has been kidnapping the missing marines and having them brainwashed to join his army of assassins. The film was less successful than the predecessor, grossing $4 million domestically in the U.S. vs. $10.5 million, but it developed a cult following.

Plot
Now US Army Rangers, Joe Armstrong and Curtis Jackson are sent to a remote Caribbean island to aid the Marine Corps in investigating the disappearance of many of its Marines. The commanding officer, "Wild Bill" Woodward briefs them on the situation: four marines were captured, but he doesn't know who or what they are since terrorism is out of the question. A boy named Toto is the only witness when he saw two soldiers get beat up by a gang and then taken by a group of men in black suits. Both men look at each other, realizing that they have been in this situation before.

Upon arriving, Charlie McDonald invites them to go water skiing. Tommy Taylor takes them on their boat to Mangrove Island, but sabotages it by unhooking the motor source. Everyone decides to swim, but Joe becomes suspicious, and wants to stay on shore. Shortly thereafter, he is attacked by ninjas but is rescued by Curtis. Their report back is discarded, nevertheless Woodward gives them a week to investigate. Tommy is told to lure Armstrong into a trap during a phone conversation with the Lion, and tells Joe where to meet him: at the Blind Beggar Bar. Joe is attacked by the same group of thugs from the beginning of the film, and proceeds to get little from Taylor about a drug dealer by the nickname of The Lion before he is killed by ninjas. Joe and Curtis inform Wild Bill, informing him that Taylor revealed a location in which the Lion conducts his experiments: Blackbeard Island. Wild Bill is all for it, but while awaiting for approval, he invites them to the governor's ball. They arrive, and Inspector Singh quickly accuses Armstrong of killing Taylor.

Wild Bill gives Jackson and Armstrong permission to rescue a girl named Alicia Sanborn after she is taken by local thugs after crashing the ball upon seeing that The Lion was there. Jackson and Armstrong (along with Charlie) follow them into the Blind Beggar's Bar and fight the local gang and escape. They pick up Wild Bill from the ball and make up a story about Armstrong disappearing to avoid being questioned by Singh. Armstrong tracks Alicia with the help of Toto, but are attacked by ninjas. He singlehandedly takes them out, before being rescued by a truck-driving Toto. One of the ninjas manages to get on the vehicle, but Armstrong makes both Toto and Alicia jump out of the vehicle before Armstrong himself jumps. The vehicle crashes into gas cans and a building, exploding the truck and killing the ninja. Joe and Alicia head on over to the boats, while Joe gives Toto a message to give to Wild Bill that they are on their way to Blackbeard Island. They have to wait awhile as patrol guards are in the water; they must wait until nighttime to travel. Alicia tells Joe about her father's plans of a scientific breakthrough to cure cancer before Burke (The Lion) bought his lab and had other plans. Jackson and the other marines have to wait on the base for a go-ahead from the ambassador, and that Armstrong is on his own for now.

Joe and Alicia reach the island and infiltrate the lab by donning ninja clothing, all while Burke is introducing his SuperNinja program. They rescue Professor Sanborn, who informs Joe where the captive marines are being held. Joe rescues the captive marines, but are caught trying to escape. All face off against a group of ninjas. Joe and the marines eventually gain the upper hand at first, but the ninjas eventually kill all but 2 of the marines. The marines stage an attack on the base, and reveal that the governor and Inspector Singh are also part of Burke's scheme. The governor is arrested by Wild Bill and his men while Singh's fate is unknown. The Professor confronts Burke and manages to destroy his SuperNinja program with a remote-control bomb, killing them both.

Joe Armstrong does one final battle with Tojo Ken (Burke's jonin, responsible for training the brainwashed marines in ninjitsu) and kills him. The marines leave the island and celebrate, while Jackson and Armstrong say goodbye to their friends as they head back to America.

Cast

 Michael Dudikoff as Sergeant Joe Armstrong
 Steve James as Sergeant Curtis Jackson
 Jeff Weston as Captain Bill "Wild Bill" Woodward
 Gary Conway as Leo "The Lion" Burke
 Michelle Botes as Alicia Sanborn
 Larry Poindexter as Sergeant Charlie McDonald
 Mike Stone as Tojo Ken

Production

Filming
Principal photography began on the film on October 27, 1986 in South Africa. The film began production under the title American Ninja 2. By November 1986 the production was filming in Johannesburg, Cape Town and Mauritius.

Reception

Box office
The film opened on May 1, 1987 where it was distributed by Cannon Releasing Corporation. The film earned $1,850,351 in its first ten days of release, playing on 398 screens.

Critical response
In a contemporary review, Johanna Steinmetz (Chicago Tribune) stated that the film was a "shameless steal" of the film Dr. No (1962) and Star Wars (1977), such as when "Joe conjures up Shinyuki for a little moral support, much the way Luke Skywalker communed with Obiwan Kenobi". The review praised Sam Firstenberg action scenes, noting that he "lavishes such care on the shooting and editing of fight scenes ("Lethal Weapon's" Richard Donner could learn plenty by watching these)."

On Metacritic the film has a weighted average score of 39 out of 100, based on 5 critics, indicating "generally unfavorable reviews".

In his book Horror and Science Fiction Film IV, Donald C. Willis dismissed the film noting "lackluster stunt work-lots of shots of bodies falling onto breakaway tables."

See also
 List of American films of 1987
 List of martial arts films

Notes

References

External links

 
 
 
 Cinapse, AMERICAN NINJA 2: THE CONFRONTATION IS A FORGOTTEN GEM at Cinapse

1987 films
1987 martial arts films
American action films
American martial arts films
1980s English-language films
Films directed by Sam Firstenberg
Films set in the Caribbean
Films set on islands
Films shot in Mauritius
Films shot in South Africa
Films scored by George S. Clinton
Golan-Globus films
Ninja films
American sequel films
Films about cloning
Films produced by Menahem Golan
Films about the United States Marine Corps
American Ninja
American science fiction films
Films produced by Yoram Globus
1980s American films